The Bermuda Triangle, also known as the Devil's Triangle, is an urban legend focused on a loosely defined region in the western part of the North Atlantic Ocean where a number of aircraft and ships are said to have disappeared under mysterious circumstances. The idea of the area as uniquely prone to disappearances arose in the mid-20th century, but most reputable sources dismiss the idea that there is any mystery.

Origins
The earliest suggestion of unusual disappearances in the Bermuda area appeared in a September 17, 1950, article published in The Miami Herald (Associated Press) by Edward Van Winkle Jones. Two years later, Fate magazine published "Sea Mystery at Our Back Door", a short article by George Sand covering the loss of several planes and ships, including the loss of Flight 19, a group of five US Navy Grumman TBM Avenger torpedo bombers on a training mission. Sand's article was the first to lay out the now-familiar triangular area where the losses took place, as well as the first to suggest a supernatural element to the Flight 19 incident. Flight 19 alone would be covered again in the April 1962 issue of American Legion magazine. In it, author Allan W. Eckert wrote that the flight leader had been heard saying, "We are entering white water, nothing seems right. We don't know where we are, the water is green, no white." He also wrote that officials at the Navy board of inquiry stated that the planes "flew off to Mars."

In February 1964, Vincent Gaddis wrote an article called "The Deadly Bermuda Triangle" in the pulp magazine Argosy saying Flight 19 and other disappearances were part of a pattern of strange events in the region. The next year, Gaddis expanded this article into a book, Invisible Horizons.

Other writers elaborated on Gaddis' ideas: John Wallace Spencer (Limbo of the Lost, 1969, repr. 1973); Charles Berlitz (The Bermuda Triangle, 1974); Richard Winer (The Devil's Triangle, 1974), and many others, all keeping to some of the same supernatural elements outlined by Eckert.

Triangle area
The Gaddis Argosy article delineated the boundaries of the triangle, giving its vertices as Miami; San Juan, Puerto Rico; and Bermuda. Subsequent writers did not necessarily follow this definition. "Indeed, some writers even stretch it as far as the Irish coast." Consequently, the determination of which accidents occurred inside the triangle depends on which writer reported them.

Criticism of the concept

Larry Kusche 

Larry Kusche, author of The Bermuda Triangle Mystery: Solved (1975), argued that many claims of Gaddis and subsequent writers were exaggerated, dubious or unverifiable. Kusche's research revealed a number of inaccuracies and inconsistencies between Berlitz's accounts and statements from eyewitnesses, participants, and others involved in the initial incidents. Kusche noted cases where pertinent information went unreported, such as the disappearance of round-the-world yachtsman Donald Crowhurst, which Berlitz had presented as a mystery, despite clear evidence to the contrary. Another example was the ore-carrier recounted by Berlitz as lost without trace three days out of an Atlantic port when it had been lost three days out of a port with the same name in the Pacific Ocean. Kusche also argued that a large percentage of the incidents that sparked allegations of the Triangle's mysterious influence actually occurred well outside it. Often his research was simple: he would review period newspapers of the dates of reported incidents and find reports on possibly relevant events like unusual weather, that were never mentioned in the disappearance stories.

Kusche concluded that:
 The number of ships and aircraft reported missing in the area was not significantly greater, proportionally speaking, than in any other part of the ocean.
 In an area frequented by tropical cyclones, the number of disappearances that did occur were, for the most part, neither disproportionate, unlikely, nor mysterious.
 Furthermore, Berlitz and other writers would often fail to mention such storms or even represent the disappearance as having happened in calm conditions when meteorological records clearly contradict this.
 The numbers themselves had been exaggerated by sloppy research. A boat's disappearance, for example, would be reported, but its eventual (if belated) return to port may not have been.
 Some disappearances had, in fact, never happened. One plane crash was said to have taken place in 1937, off Daytona Beach, Florida, in front of hundreds of witnesses.

 The legend of the Bermuda Triangle is a manufactured mystery, perpetuated by writers who either purposely or unknowingly made use of misconceptions, faulty reasoning, and sensationalism.

In a 2013 study, the World Wide Fund for Nature identified the world's 10 most dangerous waters for shipping, but the Bermuda Triangle was not among them.

Further responses
When the UK Channel 4 television program The Bermuda Triangle (1992) was being produced by John Simmons of Geofilms for the Equinox series, the marine insurance market Lloyd's of London was asked if an unusually large number of ships had sunk in the Bermuda Triangle area. Lloyd's determined that large numbers of ships had not sunk there. Lloyd's does not charge higher rates for passing through this area. United States Coast Guard records confirm their conclusion. In fact, the number of supposed disappearances is relatively insignificant considering the number of ships and aircraft that pass through on a regular basis.

The Coast Guard is also officially skeptical of the Triangle, noting that they collect and publish, through their inquiries, much documentation contradicting many of the incidents written about by the Triangle authors. In one such incident involving the 1972 explosion and sinking of the tanker , the Coast Guard photographed the wreck and recovered several bodies, in contrast with one Triangle author's claim that all the bodies had vanished, with the exception of the captain, who was found sitting in his cabin at his desk, clutching a coffee cup.  In addition, V. A. Fogg sank off the coast of Texas, nowhere near the commonly accepted boundaries of the Triangle.

The Nova/Horizon episode The Case of the Bermuda Triangle, aired on June 27, 1976, was highly critical, stating that "When we've gone back to the original sources or the people involved, the mystery evaporates. Science does not have to answer questions about the Triangle because those questions are not valid in the first place ... Ships and planes behave in the Triangle the same way they behave everywhere else in the world."

Skeptical researchers, such as Ernest Taves and Barry Singer, have noted how mysteries and the paranormal are very popular and profitable. This has led to the production of vast amounts of material on topics such as the Bermuda Triangle. They were able to show that some of the pro-paranormal material is often misleading or inaccurate, but its producers continue to market it. Accordingly, they have claimed that the market is biased in favor of books, TV specials, and other media that support the Triangle mystery, and against well-researched material if it espouses a skeptical viewpoint.

Benjamin Radford, an author and scientific paranormal investigator, noted in an interview on the Bermuda Triangle that it could be very difficult locating an aircraft lost at sea due to the vast search area, and although the disappearance might be mysterious, that did not make it paranormal or unexplainable. Radford further noted the importance of double-checking information as the mystery surrounding the Bermuda Triangle had been created by people who had neglected to do so.

Hypothetical explanation attempts 
Persons accepting the Bermuda Triangle as a real phenomenon have offered a number of explanatory approaches.

Paranormal explanations
Triangle writers have used a number of supernatural concepts to explain the events. One explanation pins the blame on leftover technology from the mythical lost continent of Atlantis. Sometimes connected to the Atlantis story is the submerged rock formation known as the Bimini Road off the island of Bimini in the Bahamas, which is in the Triangle by some definitions. Followers of the purported psychic Edgar Cayce take his prediction that evidence of Atlantis would be found in 1968, as referring to the discovery of the Bimini Road. Believers describe the formation as a road, wall, or other structure, but the Bimini Road is of natural origin.

Some hypothesize that a parallel universe exists in the Bermuda Triangle region, causing a time/space warp that sucks the objects around it into a parallel universe.  Others attribute the events to UFOs. Charles Berlitz, author of various books on anomalous phenomena, lists several theories attributing the losses in the Triangle to anomalous or unexplained forces.

Natural explanations

Compass variations
Compass problems are one of the cited phrases in many Triangle incidents. While some have theorized that unusual local magnetic anomalies may exist in the area, such anomalies have not been found. Compasses have natural magnetic variations in relation to the magnetic poles, a fact which navigators have known for centuries. Magnetic (compass) north and geographic (true) north are exactly the same only for a small number of places – for example, in the United States, only those places on a line running from Wisconsin to the Gulf of Mexico. But the public may not be as informed, and think there is something mysterious about a compass "changing" across an area as large as the Triangle, which it naturally will.

Gulf Stream
The Gulf Stream is a major surface current, primarily driven by thermohaline circulation that originates in the Gulf of Mexico and then flows through the Straits of Florida into the North Atlantic. In essence, it is a river within an ocean, and, like a river, it can and does carry floating objects. A small plane making a water landing or a boat having engine trouble can be carried away from its reported position by the current.

Human error
One of the most cited explanations in official inquiries as to the loss of any aircraft or vessel is human error. Human stubbornness may have caused businessman Harvey Conover to lose his sailing yacht, Revonoc, as he sailed into the teeth of a storm south of Florida on January 1, 1958.

Violent weather
Hurricanes are powerful storms that form in tropical waters and have historically cost thousands of lives and caused billions of dollars in damage. The sinking of Francisco de Bobadilla's Spanish fleet in 1502 was the first recorded instance of a destructive hurricane. These storms have in the past caused a number of incidents related to the Triangle. Many Atlantic hurricanes pass through the Triangle as they recurve off the Eastern Seaboard, and, before the advent of weather satellite, ships often had little to no warning of a hurricane's approach.

A powerful downdraft of cold air was suspected to be a cause in the sinking of Pride of Baltimore on May 14, 1986. A National Hurricane Center satellite specialist, James Lushine, stated "during very unstable weather conditions the downburst of cold air from aloft can hit the surface like a bomb, exploding outward like a giant squall line of wind and water." A similar event occurred to Concordia in 2010, off the coast of Brazil.

Methane hydrates

An explanation for some of the disappearances has focused on the presence of large fields of methane hydrates (a form of natural gas) on the continental shelves. Laboratory experiments carried out in Australia have proven that bubbles can, indeed, sink a scale model ship by decreasing the density of the water; any wreckage consequently rising to the surface would be rapidly dispersed by the Gulf Stream. It has been hypothesized that periodic methane eruptions (sometimes called "mud volcanoes") may produce regions of frothy water that are no longer capable of providing adequate buoyancy for ships. If this were the case, such an area forming around a ship could cause it to sink very rapidly and without warning.

Publications by the USGS describe large stores of undersea hydrates worldwide, including the Blake Ridge area, off the coast of the southeastern United States. However, according to the USGS, no large releases of gas hydrates are believed to have occurred in the Bermuda Triangle for the past 15,000 years.

Notable incidents

HMS Atalanta

The sail training ship HMS Atalanta (originally named HMS Juno) disappeared with her entire crew after setting sail from the Royal Naval Dockyard, Bermuda for Falmouth, England on 31 January 1880. It was presumed that she sank in a powerful storm which crossed her route a couple of weeks after she sailed, and that her crew being composed primarily of inexperienced trainees may have been a contributing factor. The search for evidence of her fate attracted worldwide attention at the time (connection is also often made to the 1878 loss of the training ship HMS Eurydice, which foundered after departing the Royal Naval Dockyard in Bermuda for Portsmouth on 6 March), and she was alleged decades later to have been a victim of the mysterious triangle, an allegation resoundingly refuted by the research of author David Francis Raine in 1997.

USS Cyclops

The incident resulting in the single largest loss of life in the history of the US Navy not related to combat occurred when the collier Cyclops, carrying a full load of manganese ore and with one engine out of action, went missing without a trace with a crew of 309 sometime after March 4, 1918, after departing the island of Barbados. Although there is no strong evidence for any single theory, many independent theories exist, some blaming storms, some capsizing, and some suggesting that wartime enemy activity was to blame for the loss. Both ships were transporting heavy loads of metallic ore similar to that which was loaded on Cyclops during her fatal voyage. In all three cases structural failure due to overloading with a much denser cargo than designed is considered the most likely cause of sinking.

Carroll A. Deering

Carroll A. Deering, a five-masted schooner built in 1919, was found hard aground and abandoned at Diamond Shoals, near Cape Hatteras, North Carolina, on January 31, 1921. FBI investigation into the Deering scrutinized, then ruled out, multiple theories as to why and how the ship was abandoned, including piracy, domestic Communist sabotage and the involvement of rum-runners.

Flight 19

Flight 19 was a training flight of five TBM Avenger torpedo bombers that disappeared on December 5, 1945, while over the Atlantic. The flight never returned to base. The disappearance was attributed by Navy investigators to navigational error leading to the aircraft running out of fuel.

One of the search and rescue aircraft deployed to look for them, a PBM Mariner with a 13-man crew, also disappeared. A tanker off the coast of Florida reported seeing an explosion and observing a widespread oil slick when fruitlessly searching for survivors. The weather was becoming stormy by the end of the incident.  According to contemporaneous sources the Mariner had a history of explosions due to vapour leaks when heavily loaded with fuel, as it might have been for a potentially long search-and-rescue operation.

Star Tiger and Star Ariel

G-AHNP Star Tiger disappeared on January 30, 1948, on a flight from the Azores to Bermuda; G-AGRE Star Ariel disappeared on January 17, 1949, on a flight from Bermuda to Kingston, Jamaica. Both were Avro Tudor IV passenger aircraft operated by British South American Airways. Both planes were operating at the very limits of their range and the slightest error or fault in the equipment could keep them from reaching the small island.

Douglas DC-3

On December 28, 1948, a Douglas DC-3 aircraft, number NC16002, disappeared while on a flight from San Juan, Puerto Rico, to Miami. No trace of the aircraft, or the 32 people on board, was ever found. A Civil Aeronautics Board investigation found there was insufficient information available on which to determine probable cause of the disappearance.

Connemara IV
A pleasure yacht was found adrift in the Atlantic south of Bermuda on September 26, 1955; it is usually stated in the stories (Berlitz, Winer) that the crew vanished while the yacht survived being at sea during three hurricanes. The 1955 Atlantic hurricane season shows Hurricane Ione passing nearby between 14 and 18 September, with Bermuda being affected by winds of almost gale force. In his second book on the Bermuda Triangle, Winer quoted from a letter he had received from Mr J.E. Challenor of Barbados:

KC-135 Stratotankers
However, Kusche's research showed that the unclassified version of the Air Force investigation report revealed that the debris field defining the second "crash site" was examined by a search and rescue ship, and found to be a mass of seaweed and driftwood tangled in an old buoy.

See also

 List of Bermuda Triangle incidents
 List of topics characterized as pseudoscience
 Nevada Triangle
 Devil's Sea (or Dragon's Triangle)
 Sargasso Sea
 SS Cotopaxi
 Vile vortex
 Hurricane Alley

References

Citations

Bibliography
The incidents cited above, apart from the official documentation, come from the following works. Some incidents mentioned as having taken place within the Triangle are found only in these sources:

 
 
 
 
  Reprinted in paperback in 2005; .
 
 
 

Further reading

Newspaper articles
ProQuest has newspaper source material for many incidents, archived in Portable Document Format (PDF). The newspapers include The New York Times, The Washington Post, and The Atlanta Constitution. To access this website, registration is required, usually through a library connected to a college or university.

Flight 19
 "Great Hunt On For 27 Navy Fliers Missing In Five Planes Off Florida", The New York Times, December 7, 1945.
 "Wide Hunt For 27 Men In Six Navy Planes", The Washington Post, December 7, 1945.
 "Fire Signals Seen In Area Of Lost Men", The Washington Post, December 9, 1945.

SS Cotopaxi
 "Lloyd's posts Cotopaxi As 'Missing'", The New York Times, January 7, 1926.
 "Efforts To Locate Missing Ship Fail", The Washington Post, December 6, 1925.
 "Lighthouse Keepers Seek Missing Ship", The Washington Post, December 7, 1925.
 "53 On Missing Craft Are Reported Saved", The Washington Post, December 13, 1925.

USS Cyclops (AC-4)
 "Cold High Winds Do $25,000 Damage", The Washington Post, March 11, 1918.
 "Collier Overdue A Month", The New York Times, April 15, 1918.
 "More Ships Hunt For Missing Cyclops", The New York Times, April 16, 1918.
 "Haven't Given Up Hope For Cyclops", The New York Times, April 17, 1918.
 "Collier Cyclops Is Lost; 293 Persons On Board; Enemy Blow Suspected", The Washington Post, April 15, 1918.
 "U.S. Consul Gottschalk Coming To Enter The War", The Washington Post, April 15, 1918.
 "Cyclops Skipper Teuton, 'Tis Said", The Washington Post, April 16, 1918.
 "Fate Of Ship Baffles", The Washington Post, April 16, 1918.
 "Steamer Met Gale On Cyclops' Course", The Washington Post, April 19, 1918.

Carroll A. Deering
 "Piracy Suspected In Disappearance Of 3 American Ships", The New York Times, June 21, 1921.
 "Bath Owners Skeptical", The New York Times, June 22, 1921. piera antonella
 "Deering Skipper's Wife Caused Investigation", The New York Times, June 22, 1921.
 "More Ships Added To Mystery List", The New York Times, June 22, 1921.
 "Hunt On For Pirates", The Washington Post, June 21, 1921
 "Comb Seas For Ships", The Washington Post, June 22, 1921.
 "Port Of Missing Ships Claims 3000 Yearly", The Washington Post, July 10, 1921.

Wreckers
 "'Wreckreation' Was The Name Of The Game That Flourished 100 Years Ago", The New York Times, March 30, 1969.

S.S. Suduffco
 "To Search For Missing Freighter", The New York Times, April 11, 1926.
 "Abandon Hope For Ship", The New York Times, April 28, 1926.

Star Tiger and Star Ariel
 "Hope Wanes in Sea Search For 28 Aboard Lost Airliner", The New York Times, January 31, 1948.
 "72 Planes Search Sea For Airliner", The New York Times, January 19, 1949.

DC-3 Airliner NC16002 disappearance
 "30-Passenger Airliner Disappears In Flight From San Juan To Miami", The New York Times, December 29, 1948.
 "Check Cuba Report Of Missing Airliner", The New York Times, December 30, 1948.
 "Airliner Hunt Extended", The New York Times, December 31, 1948.

Harvey Conover and Revonoc
 "Search Continuing For Conover Yawl", The New York Times, January 8, 1958.
 "Yacht Search Goes On", The New York Times, January 9, 1958.
 "Yacht Search Pressed", The New York Times, January 10, 1958.
 "Conover Search Called Off", The New York Times, January 15, 1958.

KC-135 Stratotankers
 "Second Area Of Debris Found In Hunt For Jets", The New York Times, August 31, 1963.
 "Hunt For Tanker Jets Halted", The New York Times, September 3, 1963.
 "Planes Debris Found In Jet Tanker Hunt", The Washington Post, August 30, 1963.

B-52 Bomber (Pogo 22)
 "U.S.-Canada Test Of Air Defence A Success", The New York Times, October 16, 1961.
 "Hunt For Lost B-52 Bomber Pushed In New Area", The New York Times, October 17, 1961.
 "Bomber Hunt Pressed", The New York Times, October 18, 1961.
 "Bomber Search Continuing", The New York Times, October 19, 1961.
 "Hunt For Bomber Ends", The New York Times, October 20, 1961.

Charter vessel Sno'Boy
 "Plane Hunting Boat Sights Body In Sea", The New York Times, July 7, 1963.
 "Search Abandoned For 40 On Vessel Lost In Caribbean", The New York Times, July 11, 1963.
 "Search Continues For Vessel With 55 Aboard In Caribbean", The Washington Post, July 6, 1963.
 "Body Found In Search For Fishing Boat", The Washington Post, July 7, 1963.

SS Marine Sulphur Queen
 "Tanker Lost In Atlantic; 39 Aboard", The Washington Post, February 9, 1963.
 "Debris Sighted In Plane Search For Tanker Missing Off Florida", The New York Times, February 11, 1963.
 "2.5 Million Is Asked In Sea Disaster", The Washington Post, February 19, 1963.
 "Vanishing Of Ship Ruled A Mystery", The New York Times, April 14, 1964.
 "Families Of 39 Lost At Sea Begin $20-Million Suit Here", The New York Times, June 4, 1969.
 "10-Year Rift Over Lost Ship Near End", The New York Times, February 4, 1973.

SS Sylvia L. Ossa
 "Ship And 37 Vanish In Bermuda Triangle On Voyage To U.S.", The New York Times, October 18, 1976.
 "Ship Missing In Bermuda Triangle Now Presumed To Be Lost At Sea", The New York Times, October 19, 1976.
 "Distress Signal Heard From American Sailor Missing For 17 Days", The New York Times, October 31, 1976.

Website links
The following websites have either online material that supports the popular version of the Bermuda Triangle, or documents published from official sources as part of hearings or inquiries, such as those conducted by the United States Navy or United States Coast Guard. Copies of some inquiries are not online and may have to be ordered; for example, the losses of Flight 19 or USS Cyclops can be ordered direct from the United States Naval Historical Center.
 Text of Feb, 1964 Argosy Magazine article by Vincent Gaddis
 United States Coast Guard database of selected reports and inquiries
 U.S. Navy Historical Center Bermuda Triangle FAQ 
 U.S. Navy Historical C/ The Bermuda Triangle: Startling New Secrets, Sci Fi Channel documentary (November 2005)
 Navy Historical Center: The Loss Of Flight 19
 on losses of heavy ships at sea 
 Bermuda Shipwrecks
 Association of Underwater Explorers shipwreck listings page 
 Dictionary of American Naval Fighting Ships 
 

Books
Most of the works listed here are largely out of print. Copies may be obtained at your local library, or purchased used at bookstores, or through eBay or Amazon.com. These books are often the only source material for some of the incidents that have taken place within the Triangle.
 Into the Bermuda Triangle: Pursuing the Truth Behind the World's Greatest Mystery by Gian J. Quasar, International Marine/Ragged Mountain Press (2003) ; contains list of missing craft as researched in official records. (Reprinted in paperback (2005) ).
 The Bermuda Triangle, Charles Berlitz: Out of print.
 The Bermuda Triangle Mystery Solved (1975). Lawrence David Kusche
 Limbo Of The Lost, John Wallace Spencer
 The Evidence for the Bermuda Triangle (1984), David Group
 The Final Flight (2006), Tony Blackman. This book is a work of fiction.
 Bermuda Shipwrecks (2000), Daniel Berg()
 The Devil's Triangle (1974), Richard Winer; this book sold well over a million copies by the end of its first year; to date there have been at least 17 printings.
 The Devil's Triangle 2 (1975), Richard Winer
 From the Devil's Triangle to the Devil's Jaw (1977), Richard Winer
 Ghost Ships: True Stories of Nautical Nightmares, Hauntings, and Disasters (2000), Richard Winer
 The Bermuda Triangle (1975) by Adi-Kent Thomas Jeffrey

External links

 
 
  – updated version of Quasar's Bermuda Triangle information.
 
 
 
 
 
 
 
 

 
Earth mysteries
Geography of Miami
Paranormal triangles
Supernatural legends
Urban legends